Steinbach is a provincial electoral division in the Canadian province of Manitoba that encompasses the city of Steinbach, the riding's namesake, and northeastern part of the Rural Municipality of Hanover.

The current MLA is Kelvin Goertzen, who was first elected with almost 75% of the vote in 2003. Goertzen also briefly served as Premier of Manitoba in 2021.

History
It was created by redistribution in 1989, and has formally existed since the provincial election of 1990. Originally a much larger riding in terms of geographical area, Steinbach has been redistributed three times (1999, 2011, and 2019) in response to the city of Steinbach's rapid population growth and is now among the smallest provincial ridings in terms of land area outside of Winnipeg.

The riding is currently bordered by the riding of Dawson Trail to the north and east, and La Verendrye to the south and west.  Prior to the redistribution ahead of the 2019 election, the riding was bordered by the former Emerson riding to the west, La Verendrye to the south and east, Dawson Trail to the north, and former Morris riding to the west.

Demographics
As of 2016, thirty-four per cent of the riding's residents list German as their ethnic origin, and a further 7% list themselves as Dutch. There is a very strong Mennonite presence in the riding. Steinbach's population in 2006 was 19,415. In the year 1999, the average family income was $46,133, and the unemployment rate was 5.00%.  Manufacturing accounts for 17% of the riding's industry, followed by agriculture at 14%.

Voting history
The riding has been held by the Progressive Conservative Party of Manitoba since its creation, and is considered extremely safe for that party. Steinbach's rural nature, as well as the city's religious background, gives the riding a strong social conservative tint.  Manitoba political pundits often refer to Steinbach as a "yellow dog riding," as it is one of many rural ridings where it is often said in jest that the Tories could nominate a yellow dog and still win.  It is located within the federal riding of Provencher.

List of provincial representatives

Electoral results

1990 general election

1995 general election

1999 general election

2003 general election

2007 general election

2011 general election

2016 general election

2019 general election

Previous boundaries

References

Manitoba provincial electoral districts
Steinbach, Manitoba